Syracuse University College of Law (SUCOL) is a Juris Doctor degree-granting law school of Syracuse University in Syracuse, New York. It is one of only four law schools in upstate New York. Syracuse was accredited by the American Bar Association in 1923 and is a charter member of the Association of American Law Schools. 

Syracuse's College of Law is a leader in the emerging field of National Security law through the Institute for Security Policy and Law. The College of Law is home to the New York State Science & Technology Law Center. It maintains a chapter of the Order of the Coif law honor society, of which only 86 of the more than 204 ABA-accredited law schools are a member. In February 2018, the College of Law announced its formation of the first "real-time, ABA-approved online juris doctor program in the United States." The online J.D. program, titled JDinteractive was launched in 2019.

History
The school began operating in September 1895. William Henry Hornblower, a Presbyterian minister, gave the opening address at the initiatory session of the new Syracuse Law school. It was admitted to the Phi Delta Phi legal fraternity in 1898. Classes were held in various downtown area facilities until a move to the E.I. White Hall on the SU campus in 1954.

In 1903, William Herbert Johnson became the first African American graduate of the law school, but was barred by the New York State Bar from the profession because of his race. He was posthumously admitted to the New York State Bar in October 2019.

Academics

Degree programs
The College of Law offers a residential Juris Doctor (J.D.), a Master of Laws (LL.M.), and an online Juris Doctor (JDinteractive or JDi) program.

The college offers 11 joint degree programs with, among others, Syracuse University's Maxwell School of Citizenship and Public Affairs, Newhouse School of Public Communications, and Whitman School of Management It also offers externships in, among other locations, New York City, Washington, D.C., and London. Students may also qualify for specialized certifications in areas of study such as Corporate Law, Estate Planning, Family Law, and Property Law.

Advocacy skills training
The College of Law was honored with the Emil Gumpert Award for the best law school advocacy program in the United States by the American College of Trial Lawyers. The college has won the Tiffany Cup, an award given by the New York State Bar Association to law schools that finished with the best National Trial Competition (NTC) record, 18 times as of 2014. 

Syracuse has received the highest award that the American College of Trial Lawyers gives to law schools based on the school's trial advocacy record and the strength of the school's trial training programs. In 2022 U.S. News & World Report ranked the College of Law's trial advocacy program 11th in the United States.

The college of Law has operated the Criminal Defense Clinic since 1971. The clinic helps law students gain practical courtroom experience representing low-income individuals pro-bono throughout Onondaga County, working typically on civil matters such as shoplifting, vandalism and traffic violations.

Moot court and trial team
The College of Law has won numerous national moot court competitions. In the past 16 years, its teams have won 3 national trial championships, 15 Northeast regional first-place awards, and 5 best-advocate-in-the-nation awards. Five times in the past 9 years the College of Law has been invited to the National Invitational Tournament of Champions, featuring the nation's 12 best teams. Syracuse has won other national awards in appellate, minority rights, and international tax competitions.

For more than 30 years, Syracuse's National Trial Team achieved the best record in Region II competition, winning 15 Regional Championships, two National Championships, one National Championship Runner-Up Award, three National Best Advocate Awards, and numerous Regional Advocacy Awards. From 1989 to 2001, the College of Law was invited to participate in the Tournament of Champions fall competition. The competition is only open to the 16 law schools with the best trial team records over the preceding three years. From 1983 to 2001, Syracuse's ATLA Trial Team won one National Championship, plus numerous regional awards.

Buildings and facilities

Dineen Hall

The College of Law is located in Dineen Hall on the West Campus expansion area of Syracuse University. On November 5, 2010, the university and the College of Law announced and dedicated the construction of a new law school complex, named Dineen Hall. SU Architecture alumnus Richard Gluckman, of the Gluckman Mayner Architects in New York City, was the lead architect.

Library
Its library is a congressionally designated depository for Federal materials and houses a collection of Supreme Court Justice Robert H. Jackson's artifacts and documents.

Research centers
Burton Blatt Institute
Disability Law and Policy Program (DLPP)
Innovation Law Center (ILP)
Institute for Security Policy and Law
Institute for the Study of the Judiciary, Politics, and the Media (IJPM) 
Property, Citizenship, and Social Entrepreneurism (PCSE)
Syracuse Intellectual Property Law Institute (SIPLI)

Rankings
The College of Law is tied for 103rd in the 2023 U.S. News & World Report Best Law Schools rankings.

The College of Law is ranked 64th out of 180 ABA-accredited law schools in the 2010 U.S. Law School Rankings by Super Lawyers, a Thomson Reuters company.

Employment

According to Syracuse University College of Law's 2021 ABA-required disclosures, 124 of the 165 members of the Class of 2021 obtained full-time, long-term, JD-required employment nine months after graduation, with the top three locations of employment being New York, Washington, D.C., and New Jersey. Syracuse University College of Law's Law School Transparency under-employment score for the class of 2021 is 17.6%.

Cost of Attendance
Tuition for the J.D. program is $57,290 for the 2022–23 academic year. The estimated annual cost of attendance, including tuition, fees, and living expenses, is $82,030.

Publications
 The Digest: National Italian-American Bar Association Law Journal, est. 1991
 The Journal of Global Rights and Organizations/Impunity Watch (online journal), est. 2007
 Syracuse Journal of International Law and Commerce, est. 1972
 Syracuse Journal of Science & Technology Law (JOST; formerly Syracuse Science & Technology Law Reporter and Syracuse Law and Technology Journal)
 Syracuse Law Review, est. 1949

Notable alumni

The College of Law has over 11,000 law alumni in all 50 states and 39 foreign countries.

Federal government

 Andrew P. Bakaj - Former Department of Defense and CIA Official; lead counsel for the Whisteblower during the Impeachment Inquiry and the subsequent Impeachment of President Donald Trump.
 Hugh Douglas Barclay - former United States Ambassador to El Salvador
 Rostin Behnam - Commissioner Commodity Futures Trading Commission
 Joe Biden - 46th and current president of the United States
 Ann Marie Buerkle -  Commissioner U.S. Consumer Product Safety Commission and former U.S. Representative  for 25th District of New York
 Richard J. Cardamone - Senior Judge for the United States Court of Appeals for the Second Circuit
 David Crane - former Chief Prosecutor for the Special Court for Sierra Leone
 Mae D'Agostino - Judge for the U.S. District Court, Northern District of New York
 Alfonse D'Amato - former U.S. Senator from New York
 James E. Graves Jr. - Judge for the United States Court of Appeals for the Fifth Circuit
 William Q. Hayes - Judge for the U.S. District Court, Southern District of California
 David N. Hurd - Judge for the U.S. District Court, Northern District of New York
 John Katko - U.S. Representative from the 24th District of New York
 Thomas Blake Kennedy - Senior Judge for the United States District Court for the District of Wyoming
 Randy Kuhl - former U.S. Representative from the 29th District of New York
 Robert D. Mariani - Judge for the United States District Court for the Middle District of Pennsylvania
 Neal P. McCurn - Senior Judge for the U.S. District Court, Northern District of New York
 Theodore A. McKee - Chief Judge for the U.S. Court of Appeals for the Third Circuit
 Norman A. Mordue - Senior Judge for the U.S. District Court, Northern District of New York
 Howard G. Munson - Senior Judge for the U.S. District Court, Northern District of New York
 Herman W. Nickel - former United States Ambassador to South Africa
 John Pajak - Chief Special Trial Judge, United States Tax Court
 Edmund Port - Senior Judge for the U.S. District Court, Northern District of New York
 Frederick Scullin - Senior Judge for the U.S. District Court, Northern District of New York
 Glenn T. Suddaby - Judge for the U.S. District Court, Northern District of New York
 John H. Terry - former U.S. Representative from the 34th District of New York
 Sandra L. Townes - Judge for the U.S. District Court, Eastern District of New York
 David P. Weber - former Assistant Inspector General of Investigations for the U.S. Securities and Exchange Commission (SEC), and current Maryland state university professor
 Theodore S. Weiss - former U.S. Representative from the 20th and 17th District of New York

State and local government
 Bob Antonacci - New York Supreme Court 
 William Barclay - Assemblymember, New York State Assembly, 124th Assembly District
 Beau Biden - Attorney General of Delaware
 Jeffrey Brown - former Assemblymember, New York State Assembly, 121 Assembly District
 Sydney F. Foster - former Justice New York Court of Appeals
 Vincent S. Haneman - former Associate Justice Supreme Court of New Jersey
 Jack Jackson Jr. - former Arizona State Senator
 Edmund H. Lewis - former Chief Judge of the New York Court of Appeals
 Tarky Lombardi - former New York State Senator
 William Magnarelli - Assemblymember, New York State Assembly, 120th Assembly District
 Joanie Mahoney - Onondaga County Executive
 Michael Nozzolio - former New York State Senator
 Tom O'Mara - New York State Senator
 Ted O'Brien - former New York State Senator
 Addie Jenne Russell - Assemblymember, New York State Assembly, 118th Assembly District
 Walter W. Westall - former New York State Senator
 Frank M. Williams - New York State Engineer and Surveyor

Private sector
 Adam Leitman Bailey - Lawyer, defended the Ground Zero Mosque, and other prominent cases
 William J. Brodsky - Executive Chairman of the Chicago Board Options Exchange
 Karen DeCrow - former President of the National Organization for Women
 Grey J. Dimenna - President of Monmouth University
 Tim Green - former professional athlete and New York Times best-selling author
 Carl Paladino - chief executive officer of Ellicott Development Co. and Republican Nominee for the New York gubernatorial election, 2010.
 Jay Schadler - ABC News correspondent and award-winning journalist
 Deborah F. Stanley - President of the State University of New York at Oswego
 Elizabeth Strout - Pulitzer Prize winning author of Olive Kitteridge

Other
John Barsha (born Abraham Barshofsky; 1898–1976), professional football player

Notable professors
 James E. Baker, Professor of Law, former Chief Judge to the United States Court of Appeals for the Armed Forces
 David Crane, Professor of Practice, former chief prosecutor of the Special Court for Sierra Leone 
 David Cay Johnston, Distinguished Visiting Lecturer, journalist and Pulitzer Prize for Beat Reporting winner
 Menachem Z. Rosensaft, Distinguished Visiting Lecturer, United States Holocaust Memorial Council member

See also
Syracuse University
Burton Blatt Institute
Institute for Security Policy and Law
Law of New York

References

External links

Law
 
Law schools in New York (state)
Educational institutions established in 1895
1895 establishments in New York (state)